Upadły  (German Henkenhagen) is a village in the administrative district of Gmina Golczewo, within Kamień County, West Pomeranian Voivodeship, in north-western Poland. 

The village has a population of 200.

References

Villages in Kamień County